Elmer E. Dunlap was an architect of Indianapolis, Indiana and a contractor from Columbus, Indiana, who worked often on projects designed by prolific architect William Ittner.

He designed a number of Indianapolis schools.  According to one source his "most
notable effort was P. S. #26 with its V-shaped layout".

A number of Dunlap works are listed on the U.S. National Register of Historic Places.

Works include:
Carroll County Courthouse, built during 1916–1917, which has an elaborate interior, at 101 W. Main St. Delphi, IN (Dunlap, Elmer E.), NRHP-listed
One or more works in Delphi Courthouse Square Historic District, roughly bounded by Monroe, s. side of Main, w. side of Market and Indiana Sts. Delphi, IN (Dunlap, Elmer), NRHP-listed
One or more work is in Hope Historic District, roughly bounded by Haw Cr., Grand St., Walnut St. and South St. Hope, IN (Dunlap, Elmer E.), NRHP-listed
Kokomo High School and Memorial Gymnasium, 303 E Superior St. and 400 Apperson Way N Kokomo, IN (Dunlap, Elmer), NRHP-listed 
One or more works in North Jefferson Street Historic District, Roughly bounded by W. Park Dr. and College, Madison, Collins, Oak, Stephen, and Buchanan Sts. Huntington, IN (Dunlap, Elmer), NRHP-listed
Pike County Courthouse, 801 Main St. Petersburg, IN (Dunlap, Elmer E.), NRHP-listed 
Ralph Waldo Emerson Indianapolis Public School No. 58, 321 N. Linwood St. Indianapolis, IN (Dunlap, Elmer E.), NRHP-listed
Shelbyville High School, Jct. of Second and Tompkins Sts. Shelbyville, IN (Dunlap, Elmer E.), NRHP-listed
Spencer County Courthouse, bounded by 2nd, 3rd, Main, and Walnut Sts. Rockport, IN (Dunlap, Elmer E.), NRHP-listed

References

20th-century American architects
Architects from Indiana
Architects from Indianapolis
Year of birth missing
Year of death missing